Albrecht Giese (10 February 1524 – 1 August 1580) was a councilman and diplomat of the city of Danzig (Gdańsk). He was a member of the Hanseatic League, and part of an important merchant family who had offices in London and Danzig.

Biography
Giese was born in Danzig, in the Kingdom of Poland, to the influential and wealthy merchant Patrician family Giese (or Gisze). The Giese family had emigrated from Unna, near Giesen, Cologne in 1430. They were part of the Hanseatic League, that had come to dominate European trade in the 14th and 15th-centuries. The Giese family maintained offices in London, at the Steelyard, where Hanseatic and foreign merchants congregated and his sons appear to have managed the London branch.

Albrecht studied at the Universities of Greifswald, Wittenberg and Heidelberg. As was the custom of the time for Hanseatic merchants, he toured Europe for several years to learn different languages after his formal studies, as was necessary for a long-distance trader.  In 1564, on his return to Danzig, he married Elisabeth Langenbeck, whose uncle, Johann Ferber, had been the Mayor of Danzig. The following year, Giese became a councilman. Over the next six years, he was Danzig's delegate at several Hanse meetings in Lübeck.

Open conflict between the Polish king and the city council broke out when the city council was arrested for opposing the loss of certain privileges according to the terms of the declared Union of Lublin, which the city had not agreed to. Negotiations between the city and the king took place in 1568/69, initially at Piotrków Trybunalski. Giese was a member of a delegation, led by the mayor of the city, Johann Brandes in negotiations. Despite being subjected to severe pressure and incarceration for a year at Kraków, the delegation refused to submit to the king's terms, thereby upholding independence, Giese and Councilor Georg Kleefeld were eventually released in 1570 against a ransom of 100,000 guilders.

Giese ultimately became Mayor of Danzig. In 1579, Giese was named royal burgrave of Danzig by the Polish king, a position that entailed the supervision of the judiciary system of the city.

Albrect and Elisabeth Giese had at least seven children. Two of his sons enjoyed prominent careers. One of his older sons, Tiedemann Giese, became the Bishop of Chełm (Culm) and later, Prince-Bishop of Warmia (Ermland), while one of the younger sons, Georg Giese became a merchant and who is noted for having his portrait painted by Hans Holbein the younger.

Albrecht Giese died in 1580 in Danzig.

References

External links
 List of Royal Burggraves of Danzig
 List of Burgomasters of Danzig

1524 births
1580 deaths
Mayors of Gdańsk
University of Greifswald alumni
People from Royal Prussia
Businesspeople from Gdańsk